The 2009 Men's Asia Pacific Floorball Championships were the sixth such championships in men's floorball. They were held from March 25 to March 29, 2009 in Pyeongtaek, South Korea. All matches were played at the Lee Chung Gymnasium. Singapore came into the tournament as defending champions.

The 2009 Men's Asia Pacific Floorball Championships were just the second to be held outside of Singapore City.

The tournament was organised by the Asia Oceania Floorball Confederation (AOFC).

A new floorball world record was set on March 26, 2009, when Japan defeated India, 59:0. The previous world record was in a women's under-19 friendly, where Poland defeated Ukraine by a score of 50:0.

Championship results

March 25, 2009

March 26, 2009

March 27, 2009

March 28, 2009

March 29, 2009

Standings
Official Rankings according to the AOFC

|- style="text-align: center; background: #ffa07a;"
| style="text-align:center;" colspan="3"|Asia Pacific Floorball Championships

See also
 Asia Oceania Floorball Confederation
 List of Asia Pacific Floorball Champions

External links
 IFF - Official APAC 2009 Webpage

Mens Asia Pacific Floorball Championships, 2009
Floorball competitions
Floorball in Oceania
Floorball in Asia